The Facts of Life is an American television sitcom created by Dick Clair and Jenna McMahon and a spin-off of Diff'rent Strokes that originally aired on NBC from August 24, 1979, to May 7, 1988, making it one of the longest-running sitcoms of the 1980s. The series focuses on Edna Garrett (Charlotte Rae), as she becomes a housemother (and from the second season onward, a dietitian as well) at the fictional Eastland School, an all-girls boarding school in Peekskill, New York.

Plot

Season 1
A spin-off of Diff'rent Strokes, the series featured the Drummonds' former housekeeper Edna Garrett (Charlotte Rae) working in a new job as the housemother of a dormitory at Eastland School, a private all-girls school in Peekskill, New York. The girls in her care included spoiled rich girl Blair Warner (Lisa Whelchel); the youngest, gossipy Dorothy "Tootie" Ramsey (Kim Fields), and impressionable Natalie Green (Mindy Cohn).

The pilot for the show was originally aired as the last episode of the first season of Diff'rent Strokes and was called "The Girls' School (a.k.a. Garrett's Girls)." The plot line for the pilot had Kimberly Drummond (Dana Plato) requesting that Mrs. Garrett help her sew costumes for a student play at East Lake School for Girls, the school Kimberly attended in Upstate New York, as her dorm's housemother had recently quit. Mrs. Garrett agrees to help, puts on a successful play and also solves a problem for the boyfriend-obsessed Nancy Olsen (Felice Schachter) as she also meets Blair, Tootie, the small-town girl from Kansas, Sue Ann Weaver (Julie Piekarski), and the budding activist Molly Parker (Molly Ringwald). Mrs. Garrett is asked to stay on as the new housemother but says she would rather continue working for the Drummonds at the end of the pilot.

After the pilot, the name of the school was changed to Eastland and characters were replaced with Natalie, athletic tomboy Cindy Webster (Julie Anne Haddock), and Mr. Bradley becoming part of the main group featured. Although Kimberly Drummond is featured as a student at East Lake, her character did not cross over to the spinoff series with Mrs. Garrett. In the show's first season, episodes focus on the issues of seven girls, with the action usually set in a large, wood-paneled common room of a girls' dormitory. Also appearing was the school's headmaster, Mr. Steven Bradley (John Lawlor) and Miss Emily Mahoney (Jenny O'Hara), an Eastland teacher who was dropped after the first four episodes. Early episodes of the show typically revolve around a central morality-based or "lesson teaching" theme. The show's pilot episode plot included a storyline in which Blair Warner insinuates that her schoolmate Cindy Webster is a lesbian, because she is a tomboy and frequently shows affection for other girls. Other season one episodes deal with issues including drug use, sex, eating disorder, parental relationships, and peer pressure.

Seasons 2–8
The producers felt that there were too many characters given the limitations of the half-hour sitcom format and that the plotlines should be more focused to give the remaining girls more room for character development. Four of the original actresses—Julie Anne Haddock (Cindy), Julie Piekarski (Sue Ann), Felice Schachter (Nancy) and Molly Ringwald (Molly)—were written out of the show, although the four did make periodic guest appearances in the second and third seasons, and all but Molly Ringwald appeared in one "reunion" episode in the eighth season. Mr. Bradley's character was also dropped and replaced by Mr. Charles Parker (Roger Perry). Mr. Parker appeared in episodes through the beginning of season 5. In addition to being housemother to the remaining girls, Mrs. Garrett became the school dietitian as the second season began. Jo Polniaczek (Nancy McKeon), a new student originally from the Bronx, arrived at Eastland on scholarship. A run-in with the law forced the four to be separated from the other girls and work in the cafeteria, living together in a spare room next to Mrs. Garrett's bedroom. The season two premiere of the retooled series saw an immediate ratings increase. By its third season (1981–82), Facts of Life had become NBC's No. 1 comedy and No. 2 overall NBC program, beating its predecessor, Diff'rent Strokes, for the first time.

In 1983, Jo and Blair graduated Eastland Academy in the highly anticipated season four finale "Graduation". Keeping the four girls under one roof the season five premiere which was an hour long, "Brave New World", shows Mrs. Garrett going into business for herself and opening a gourmet food venture named Edna's Edibles. The four girls came to live and work with Mrs. Garrett in the new refreshed space. In September 1985, NBC moved the seventh season of the series to its burgeoning Saturday night lineup at 8:30, as a lead-in for the new series The Golden Girls at 9 pm. In an attempt to refresh the "ratings work horse" and increase ratings, George Clooney was added to the regular cast and Mrs. Garrett's store was gutted by fire in the season seven premiere "Out of the Fire". The follow-up episodes "Into the Frying Pan" and "Grand Opening" had the girls join together to rebuild the store with a pop culture-influenced gift shop, called Over Our Heads. The changes proved successful as all three episodes placed in the top ten ratings each week. By the end of the season, TV Guide reported, "Facts success has been so unexpected that scions of Hollywood are still taken aback by it... Facts has in fact been among NBC's top-ranked comedies for the past five years. It finished twenty-seven overall for the 1985–1986 season, handily winning its time slot against its most frequent competitors, Airwolf and Benson. Lisa Whelchel stated, 'We're easily overlooked because we've never been a huge hit; we just sort of snuck in there.'"

Charlotte Rae initially reduced her role in seasons six and seven and later decided to leave the series altogether, believing she had done all she could do with her character and desired to move on to other projects. In season eight's heavily promoted one-hour premiere, "Out of Peekskill" Mrs. Garrett married the man of her dreams and joined him in Africa while he worked for the Peace Corps. Mrs. Garrett convinces her sister, Beverly Ann Stickle (Cloris Leachman), to take over the shop and look after the girls. The character of Beverly Ann had a similar personality to Leachman's previous Emmy-winning role as Phyllis Lindstrom on two 1970s CBS sitcoms–The Mary Tyler Moore Show and Phyllis.  Beverly Ann later legally adopted Over Our Heads worker Andy Moffett (Mackenzie Astin) in the episode "A Boy About the House". Describing the new changes to The Facts of Life, Brandon Tartikoff, the president of NBC Entertainment, said he "was surprised that The Facts of Life performed well this season, as, with a major cast change and all, I thought it might not perform as it had in the past. Facts has been renewed for next season."

Final season
In the ninth and final season, the series aired on NBC's Saturday lineup at 8 pm, NBC still had confidence in the series, making it the 8 p.m. anchor, kicking off the network's second-highest rated night (after Thursdays). For the February Nielsen rating sweeps, the writers created a controversial storyline in this season for the episode titled "The First Time". Natalie became the first of the girls to lose her virginity. Lisa Whelchel refused this storyline that would have made her character, not Natalie, the first among the four young women in the show to lose her virginity. Having become a Christian when she was 10, Whelchel would not say the lines because of her religious convictions. Whelchel appeared in every episode of the show but asked to be written out of "The First Time". The episode ran a parental advisory before it began and placed 22nd in the ratings for the week. With the show still easily winning its timeslot, NBC had made plans to renew The Facts of Life for a 10th season but two castmates–Mindy Cohn and Nancy McKeon–chose to leave at the conclusion of season nine.

Cast

Main characters

Recurring characters
A key recurring character was Geri Tyler (Geri Jewell), Blair's cousin who has cerebral palsy. Jewell's character primarily was created in order to show Blair's more sympathetic side but Cousin Geri eventually inspired many other people with disabilities interested in the entertainment industry. Other recurring characters included the judgment-impaired Miko Wakamatsu (Lauren Tom), the delivery boy Roy (Loren Lester) who was enamored with Jo, the royal princess Alexandra (Heather McAdam) and the snobbish Boots St. Clair (Jami Gertz). Shoplifter Kelly (Pamela Segall) was billed as a regular during the fifth season. Other guest roles included the boyfriends of the girls; Jo's parents, played by Alex Rocco and Claire Malis; Blair's parents, played by Nicolas Coster and Marj Dusay; Tootie's parents, played by Chip Fields (Kim Fields's real-life mother) and Robert Hooks and Natalie's parents, played by Norman Burton and Mitzi Hoag. Characters from Diff'rent Strokes also appeared in some episodes of both season one and season two. Other recurring characters included Tootie's boyfriend Jeff Williams (Todd Hollowell), Blair's boyfriend Cliff (Woody Brown), and Charles Parker (Roger Perry), who served as headmaster of Eastland following Lawlor's exit from the show.

Production

Development
The Facts of Life was produced first by T.A.T. Communications Company, later known as Embassy Television (Norman Lear's production companies) and then as Embassy Communications and Columbia Pictures Television (through ELP Communications) on January–May 1988 episodes of the series. Sony Pictures Television currently owns the distribution rights to the sitcom. From 1979 until 1982 the show was produced at Metromedia Square in Los Angeles. In 1982, production moved to Universal City Studios and then to Sunset Gower Studios in 1985.

Theme music
The show's theme was composed by Al Burton, Gloria Loring and her then-husband, Alan Thicke. The well-known opening lyric "You take the good, you take the bad..." came later as the first season lyrics, some of them performed by Rae and the original cast differed from those that followed, later sung by Loring. The original lyrics eventually shifted to the closing credits before being dropped entirely. Burton, Loring, and Thicke had previously composed the theme to Diff'rent Strokes, which was sung by Thicke.

Episodes

Television films

The Facts of Life Goes to Paris
The Facts of Life Goes to Paris, a two-hour TV movie in which Mrs. Garrett and the girls travel to France, aired September 25, 1982. It scored 18.1/31 in the Nielsen Ratings. The movie was later added to the American syndication package, separated into four half-hour episodes; however, the original cut of the film appears on the Season 4 DVD set in 2010. The TV movie was directed by Asaad Kelada.

The Facts of Life Down Under
The Facts of Life Down Under, another two-hour TV movie, aired Sunday, February 15, 1987 placing a strong No. 13 for the week garnering 21.4/32. This was strategic counterprogramming by NBC, which placed the movie against the conclusion of ABC's highly publicized miniseries Amerika. The Telemovie was also syndicated as four half-hour episodes in later U.S. airings.

The Facts of Life Reunion
The Facts of Life Reunion, a two-hour TV movie reunion aired on ABC November 18, 2001, in which Mrs. Garrett and the girls are reunited in Peekskill, New York, for the Thanksgiving holiday. It occasionally aired in the United States on ABC Family. Nancy McKeon (Jo) did not appear in the movie; her character's absence is explained as being on assignment as a police officer.

Syndication
NBC aired daytime reruns of The Facts of Life from December 13, 1982 until June 28, 1985 at 10 a.m. (and later noon) on the daytime schedule. Episodes aired on television stations nationwide from September 15, 1986 to September 10, 1993, then aired on the USA Network on and off from September 13, 1993 to September 11, 1998. In August 1994, the network celebrated the show's 15th anniversary with a day-long marathon of 14 episodes featuring new interviews with Rae, Whelchel and Cohn. Episodes aired on Nick at Nite from September 4, 2000 to June 28, 2001, although the network did not air certain episodes that contained highly mature content during primetime (including the first-season episode "Dope"), instead opting to air episodes with more serious topics at late night/early morning times. TV Land aired 48 hours of The Facts of Life episodes on its "Fandemonium Marathon Weekend" on November 17–19, 2001. The Hallmark Channel aired The Facts of Life from July 1 to November 1, 2002. Episodes were available on Comcast's Video-On-Demand service from August 8, 2005 to July 31, 2006 and again from the August 6, 2007 until Tube Time's shutdown date on December 31, 2009. On July 16, 2008 full episodes and short "minisodes" of The Facts of Life became available online via Hulu. On March 12, 2012, TeenNick added the series to their morning lineup; however, the series' addition to the channel was short-lived, as it left the schedule on April 3, 2012. The series premiered on The Hub on April 2, 2012, where it rerun until March 22, 2013 and later moved to Logo TV. Most recently, Antenna TV started airing The Facts of Life on January 2, 2020.  The series also airs on Logo TV in various time slots.  As of March 2022, the series has also been airing in daily blocks and on Saturdays in day long marathons on the GAC Family cable network.

International airings
 In Brazil, the show aired on Nick at Nite as Vivendo e Aprendendo (Living and Learning in English).
 In Latin America and Mexico, the show aired as Los Hechos de la Vida aired on The Warner Channel and Nick at Nite.
 In Italy, seasons one through nine were aired in 1983–1992 (dubbed as usual in Italian), on the terrestrial television network Canale 5, the first Italian commercial network, and later on other local commercial television networks. The Italian version was named L'albero delle mele, which means The apple tree (the word "apple" is popularly used euphemistically in Italian as a reference to teenage girls).
 In France, seasons one to nine (dubbed in French and titled Drôle de vie) which means Funny Life, aired in 1987 until 1988 on the terrestrial television network La Cinq, and seasons one to nine aired on TF1 from 1991 until 1996 as part of a block called Club Dorothée.
 In the United Kingdom, unlike Diff'rent Strokes, The Facts of Life has never aired on terrestrial television. A few seasons aired on the UK BSB satellite channels, and after BSB merged with Sky Television, the entire series was shown on Sky One.
 In Canada, The Facts of Life was a mainstay on CBC Television–the Canadian public broadcaster, airing concurrently with the NBC airings as well as weekdays in stripped reruns at 4:00 p.m. (4:30 p.m. in Newfoundland) until April 1992. Crossroads Television System (CTS), a Christian-based network, aired it from September 2006 to 2009. Beginning on September 15, 2007, The Facts of Life aired weekends at 10:00 a.m. and 2:00 p.m. on Canwest's digital specialty channel, DejaView, which later moved it to weekdays at 4:00 p.m. and 4:30 p.m. in March 2010. As of 2019, Hamilton, Ontario-based CHCH currently airs the series on weekdays at 4:00 p.m. (Eastern Time). The entire series is also currently available for online streaming on CTV.ca, as part of an ad-supported video on demand service called CTV Throwback.

Reception
RatingsThe Facts of Life was originally not a ratings winner on Friday nights in its summer debut in 1979 or in its second tryout in the spring of 1980. It ranked 74th of 79 shows on the air in the year-end Nielsen ratings and was NBC's lowest-rated series. The show was put on hiatus and extensively retooled in preparation for season two. In November 1980, season two of The Facts of Life premiered in a Wednesday 9:30 p.m. time slot, where it immediately flourished, peaking in January 1981 with a 27.4 rating and 41 share; it ranked No. 4 for the week. The program became NBC's fourth highest-rated scripted series, after Little House on the Prairie, Diff'rent Strokes and CHiPs. By the third season, the series moved time slots to 9:00 pm. Wednesdays and soon became NBC's highest-rated comedy series and NBC's No. 2 overall series, after Real People. For its seventh season, it moved to Saturdays at 8:30 p.m., to bolster the premiering series The Golden Girls at 9 p.m. in the newly formed Saturday night comedy block. At the start of the eighth season, the series was moved forward a half-hour to the toughest time slot on television–Saturday at 8 pm, which brought the ratings down from its season seven high. Still, the series easily won its time slot and garnered high numbers in the coveted teen and 18–49 demographics. One of the highest rated season eight episodes saw the original season one cast return for a mini-reunion. Titled "The Little Chill", it placed No. 19 for the week with an 18.2 rating and 31 share. In the article "Ratings Top with Teens" appearing in the January 19, 1988 edition of USA Today, The Facts of Life was ranked as one of the top 10 shows in a survey of 2,200 American teenagers.

Nielsen Ratings
1979–1980 – #74
1980–1981 – #26
1981–1982 – #24 (Tied with Little House on the Prairie)
1982–1983 – #32
1983–1984 – #24
1984–1985 – #34
1985–1986 – #27
1986–1987 – #31
1987–1988 – #37 (Tied with Highway to Heaven)

Awards
 Emmy Award nomination for Best Actress (1982) – Charlotte Rae
 Emmy Award nomination for Outstanding Technical Direction/Electronic Camerawork/Video Control for a Series (1986) – for episode "Come Back to the Truck Stop, Natalie Green, Natalie Green".
 Emmy Award nomination for Outstanding Achievement in Hairstyling for a Series (1987) – for episode "'62 Pickup".
 TV Land Award for Pop Culture Icon in 2011.

Home media
On April 21 and 22, 2001, Columbia House released The Facts of Life: The Collector's Edition, a 10-volume "Best of" the series on VHS (40 episodes in all). With the advent shortly thereafter of TV on DVD and Columbia House's eventual move from the direct marketing model of exclusive series, the tapes were discontinued. Sony Pictures Home Entertainment released the first two seasons on DVD in Region 1 on May 9, 2006 with new interviews with most of the cast, including first season regulars Felice Schachter and Julie Anne Haddock. To promote the DVD's release, McKeon, Whelchel and Cohn appeared together on various TV shows such as Entertainment Tonight, Today, and CNN Showbiz to reminisce about their time on the show and talk about their lives presently; unfortunately, Fields was unable to take part due to other commitments. The third season was released on October 24, 2006. This release failed to match the success of the first and second seasons, sales-wise. The first and second seasons were also released in Region 4 on March 7, 2007. In 2010, Shout! Factory acquired the rights to the series and released the fourth season on Region 1 DVD on May 4, 2010. Special features include The Facts of Life Goes To Paris, a made-for-TV-movie (which originally aired a few days prior to the fourth season debut) and a "Know The Facts: Trivia Game." They have subsequently released seasons five through nine on DVD. Mill Creek Entertainment re-released the first and second seasons on DVD on May 20, 2014. It is unknown as to whether or not Mill Creek will release any further seasons. On January 13, 2015, Shout! Factory released The Facts of Life – The Complete Series on DVD in Region 1. The 26-disc set contains all 201 episodes of the series as well as the two made-for-TV films (The Facts of Life Goes to Paris and The Facts of Life Down Under) and other bonus features including an all-new cast reunion. The Facts of Life Reunion film is not included in this collection and has yet to be released on DVD.

Attempted spin-offs
The various attempts at spin-offs were backdoor pilots, which were shown as episodes of The Facts of Life.

"Brian & Sylvia" – A season two episode in which Tootie and Natalie go to Buffalo, New York to visit Tootie's Aunt Sylvia, a black woman (played by Rosanne Katon) who has recently married a white man, played by Richard Dean Anderson (the future star of MacGyver and Stargate SG-1). Ja'Net DuBois of Good Times'' played Ethel, who was both Tootie's grandmother and Sylvia's mother. The episode never developed into a series and in the season five episode "Crossing the Line", Tootie mentions Brian's and Sylvia's interracial marriage and says that the two have recently gotten divorced.
"The Academy" – A season three episode set at Stone Academy, an all-boys military school that was near Eastland. In this episode, the girls at Eastland attended a dance with the boys from the military school. The boys included actors Jimmy Baio, Ben Marley, David Ackroyd, Peter Frechette, and John P. Navin Jr.
"Jo's Cousin" – Another season three episode, in which Jo visits her family in the Bronx, including her cousin Terry, a fourteen-year-old girl (played by Megan Follows) going through adolescence in a family full of men. The family included actors Grant Cramer, John Mengatti, Donnelly Rhodes, and D.W. Brown.
"The Big Fight" – A season four episode set at Stone Academy, a boys' military school. Natalie comes to visit a boy who tries to impress her with his boxing. This episode includes the same cast from the season three episode "The Academy", with the addition of '80s 'nerd' icon Eddie Deezen.
"Graduation" – This spin-off was to revolve around Blair and Jo's life at Langley College.
"Big Apple Blues" – A season nine episode in which Natalie spends the night with a group of eccentric young people living in a SoHo loft, and decides to remain in New York to begin her life. Two of the tenants in the loft were played by David Spade and Richard Grieco.
"The Beginning of the End/Beginning of the Beginning" – The two-part series finale sees Blair buying Eastland to prevent its closing. Blair finds that the school is in such dire financial straits that she is forced to make the school co-ed. Blair then essentially adopts the Mrs. Garrett role as she presides over the school and is forced to deal with the trouble-making students in a plot line that is highly reminiscent of the season two premiere. The new Eastland students included Seth Green, Mayim Bialik, future Oscar-nominee Juliette Lewis, and Meredith Scott Lynn.

Notes

References

External links
 
 
 The Facts of Life site at www.televisionhit.com: Extensive site for the television series.

 
1970s American school television series
1970s American sitcoms
1979 American television series debuts
1980s American school television series
1980s American teen sitcoms
1988 American television series endings
American television spin-offs
English-language television shows
NBC original programming
Television series about teenagers
Television series by Sony Pictures Television
Television shows set in New York (state)